Rahma Landy Sjahruddin (born October 19, 1982) popularly known as Rahma Landy is an Indonesian-Irish actress, TV presenter, dentist, fashion model and a beauty pageant titleholder who won the title of Puteri Indonesia Lingkungan 2006. She represented Indonesia at the Miss International 2007 pageant in Japan, where she placed as the Top 15 semi-finalist, became the third Indonesian to be called as Miss International Finalists after Treesye Ratri Nugraheni Astuti who placed for the first time in Miss International 1976 and Indri Hapsari Suharto who won 2nd Runner-up in respective Miss International 1977.

Early life and education
Rahma was born in Jakarta – Indonesia to an Javanese-Irish parents, who has been living in Australia and Lebanon. In 2005, before joining Puteri Indonesia, she won Wajah Femina, hold by Femina (Indonesia) magazine. She holds a master degree in Doctor of Dentistry (DDent) from Trisakti University, Jakarta, Indonesia. Now she is currently work as a dentist.

Pageantry

Puteri Jakarta SCR 2006
In 2006, Rahma competed in the regional pageant of Puteri Jakarta SCR 2006, and won the title to represent her province Jakarta in Puteri Indonesia 2006. She was crowned by the outgoing titleholder Rahma Alia.

Puteri Indonesia 2006
Rahma was crowned as Puteri Indonesia Lingkungan 2006 at the grand finale held in Jakarta Convention Center, Jakarta, Indonesia on March 9, by the outgoing titleholder of Puteri Indonesia Lingkungan 2005 and Miss World Indonesia 2005, Lindi Cistia Prabha of Special Region of Yogyakarta. Rahma represented the Jakarta SCR 5 province at the pageant.

Miss International 2007
As Puteri Indonesia Lingkungan 2006, Rahma represented Indonesia at the 47th edition of Miss International 2007 pageant in held in Tokyo Dome City Hall, Bunkyo, Tokyo, Japan. The finale was held on October 15, 2007, where Rahma placed as one of the Top 15 finalists, she wore the dress designed by Ivan Gunawan. Daniela di Giacomo of Venezuela crowned her successor Priscila Perales of Mexico by the end of the event.

Filmography
Rahma has appeared in several film and television films in Indonesia.

Movies

Television films

See also
 Puteri Indonesia
 Miss International
 Miss International 2007
 Agni Pratistha Arkadewi Kuswardono

References

External links

 
 Puteri Indonesia Official Website
 Miss International Official Website
 Rahma Landy Sjahruddin Official Instagram

Living people
1982 births
Puteri Indonesia winners
Miss International 2007 delegates
Mental health activists
Indonesian beauty pageant winners
Indonesian female models
Indonesian stage actresses
Indonesian film actresses
Indonesian television actresses
Indonesian Muslims
Actresses from Jakarta
Trisakti University alumni
Javanese people
People from Jakarta